The 12627/12628 Karnataka Express is a daily Superfast train that runs between Bengaluru, the capital of Karnataka, and the Indian capital New Delhi.

History

Bangalore was first connected to the north with Kerala - Karnataka (also known as KK) express introduced in 1976. The train ran from New Delhi to Jolarpettai and was split into two trains, one going to Bangalore and the other to Trivandrum. This continued until 1983 when Karnataka express was launched in the February 1983 budget as a single biweekly train running on 3 routes on different days of the week. The routes were via Secunderabad, Manmad, and Vijayawada. The train was then rerouted via Dharmavaram - Guntakal - Wadi - Daund - Bhusaval and continues to run on the same route to this day.

Route & halts

Timings
The train runs on all 7 days of the week. 12627 and 12628 depart in the late evening and reach their destinations on the third morning and afternoon respectively.

Traction

The train is hauled by a WAP 7 locomotive of Royapuram / Lallaguda / Tuglakabad sheds on end to end basis.

Coach replacement and coach composition

Karnataka express used to run with ICF coaches until 10 November 2021, when it was given LHB coaches.
The coach composition is as follows:
 1 Second luggage, guard and disabled passenger compartment. (LSLRD)
 2 Second sitting coaches.
 11 sleeper coaches.
 4 Third AC coaches.
 1 Second AC coach. 
 1 First AC coach.
 1 Pantry car coach. 
 1 End on Generator coach.
 1 or 2 High capacity parcel van coaches. (HCP)

The train runs with 24 coaches in the up direction and 23 coaches in the down direction. 
THe train shares its rakes with 12657/12658 KSR Bengaluru - MGR Chennai central Mail.

Coach arrangement for 12627

Coach arrangement for 12627 is as follows.

Coach arrangement for 12628

Coach arrangement for 12628 is as follows.

Accidents and Incidents

 On 14 May 1989 Karnataka Express derailed near a bridge near Lalitpur, Uttar Pradesh killing 69. Several passengers had been complaining to the service staff of intermittent but strong and unusual jerks even before the train arrived at Bhopal, and the delayed train was speeding at more than 100 kilometres per hour. An engine or axle failure has been suspected as the cause of the derailment.

 On 28 July 1997 Karnataka Express and Himsagar Express collided on the outskirts of Delhi, killing 12.

References

External links

Transport in Bangalore
Transport in Delhi
Express trains in India
Rail transport in Karnataka
Named passenger trains of India
Rail transport in Uttar Pradesh
Rail transport in Madhya Pradesh
Rail transport in Maharashtra
Rail transport in Andhra Pradesh
Rail transport in Delhi
Railway services introduced in 1976